The following is a list of the American radio and television networks and announcers that have broadcast the Major League Baseball All-Star Game over the years.

Television

2020s

Notes
On July 3, 2020, it was announced that the 2020 Major League Baseball All-Star Game scheduled to be held in Los Angeles would not be played due to the coronavirus pandemic. They will instead host in 2022.
The 2021 game was originally scheduled to be played at Truist Field in Atlanta, GA, home of the Atlanta Braves. However, because of a new voting bill being passed in Atlanta, Major League Baseball relocated the game, the 2021 Home Run Derby, and the 2021 MLB draft (a new addition to the All-Star festivities) to Denver.

2010s

Notes
The 2010 All-Star Game marked the first time the annual game would be shown in 3D. Kenny Albert and Mark Grace were the announcers for the 3D broadcast.

2000s

Notes
In 2008, Fox went on the air at 7:00 p.m. Eastern Time with a special, one-hour "red carpet parade" show hosted by Jeanne Zelasko and Chris Rose. Also contributing to the program were reporters Mark Grace, Laura Okmin, and Charissa Thompson. This was followed by play-by-play man Joe Buck presiding over the pregame festivities (e.g. player introductions and the singing of "The Star-Spangled Banner") via the public address system.
The British rights-holder for this game, five (now known as Channel 5) ended its coverage at 6 a.m. BST with the game still in the 12th inning. The network explained that it had a commitment to carry the children's show The Wiggles that it could not break. The situation is similar to the infamous "Heidi Game" on the U.S. network NBC in 1968.

1990s

Notes
The 1990 All-Star Game from Chicago's Wrigley Field was marred by an approximately 68-minute rain delay during the top of the 7th inning. In the meantime, CBS aired Rescue 911.
For CBS' coverage of the 1992 All-Star Game, they introduced Basecam, a lipstick-size camera, inside first base.
The 1992 All-Star Game on CBS was interrupted with coverage of the Democratic National Convention.
In June 1993, CBS Sports' Lesley Visser suffered a jogging accident in New York's Central Park in which she broke her hip and skidded face-first across the pavement. She required reconstructive plastic surgery on her face and in 2006, she required an artificial hip replacement. She missed the 1993 Major League Baseball All-Star Game due to the accident. In Visser's place in the meantime, came Jim Kaat.
The 1994 All-Star Game marked NBC's first broadcast of a Major League Baseball game since Game 5 of the 1989 National League Championship Series on October 9. It also marked the inaugural broadcast of "The Baseball Network", which was a short-lived (lasting through the conclusion of the 1995 World Series), revenue-sharing joint venture between NBC, ABC, and Major League Baseball. The '94 All-Star game also was broadcast in Spanish on NBC's Secondary Audio Program. Boston Red Sox announcer Héctor Martínez and seven time All-Star Tony Pérez were the announcers for the occasion.

1980s

Notes
The 1981 All-Star Game is to date, the only one to be played on a weekend (Sunday night). The game was originally to be played on July 14, but was cancelled due to the players' strike lasting from June 12 to July 31. It was then brought back as a prelude to the second half of the season, which began the following day.
For NBC's 1983 All-Star Game coverage, Don Sutton was in New York City, periodically tracking pitches with the aid of NBC's "Inside Pitch" technology.
In 1984, Jim Palmer only served as a between innings analyst for ABC's coverage.
In , NBC's telecast of the All-Star Game out of the Metrodome in Minnesota was the first program to be broadcast in stereo by a TV network.
Former President of the United States, Ronald Reagan (who had just left office) served as the color commentator instead of Tom Seaver (Vin Scully's normal NBC broadcasting partner at the time) for the first inning of the 1989 game.

1970s

Notes
1976 – The ABC team of Bob Prince, Bob Uecker, and Warner Wolf alternated roles for the broadcast. For the first three innings, Prince did play-by-play with Wolf on color commentary and Uecker doing field interviews. For the middle innings, Uecker worked play-by-play with Prince on color and Wolf doing the interviews. For the rest of the game, Wolf worked play-by-play with Uecker on color and Prince doing interviews.
ABC aired Democratic National Convention coverage from roughly 7:30-8 p.m. EDT prior to the game and another half hour after the game.

1960s

Notes
 The 1967 All-Star Game in Anaheim can be considered the first "prime time" telecast of a Major League Baseball All-Star Game. The game started at approximately 7:00 p.m. on the East Coast. Sports Illustrated, noting that the game “began at 4 p.m. in California and ended at 11 p.m. Eastern Daylight Time,” reported “an estimated 55 million people watched the game, compared with 12 million viewers for the 1966 All-Star Game, played in the afternoon.”
Buddy Blattner, broadcaster for the host California Angels, appeared briefly at the beginning of the NBC telecast to introduce viewers to Anaheim Stadium before moving to the NBC Radio booth for the game itself. Houston Astros announcer Gene Elston was used in the same role for the 1968 game at the Astrodome.
 The 1969 game was originally scheduled for the evening of Tuesday, July 22, but heavy rains forced its postponement to the following afternoon.  The 1969 contest remains the last All-Star Game to date to be played earlier than prime time in the Eastern United States.
 Charlie Jones served as an "in-the-stands" reporter for NBC's coverage.

1950s

Notes
During the 1955 All-Star Game, NBC director Harry Coyle introduced the center field pitcher-batter camera shot to supplement the standard behind home-plate view. The angle allowed viewers to follow the ball from the pitcher's hand all the way into the catcher's mitt.
The 1952 All-Star Game in Philadelphia was the first nationally televised All-Star Game, but it was shortened by rain.
In 1950, the Mutual Broadcasting System acquired the television broadcast rights to the World Series and All-Star Game for the next six years. Mutual may have been reindulging in TV network dreams or simply taking advantage of a long-standing business relationship; in either case, the broadcast rights were sold to NBC in time for the following season's games at an enormous profit.

1940s

Radio

2020s

2010s

2000s

1990s

1980s

1970s

1960s

1950s

1940s

1930s

Notes
Up until at least, the late 1970s-early 1980s, a majority of the radio announcing crews for the All-Star Game split play-by-play duties, doing either the first 4½ or last 4½ innings.

References

External links

 All-Star Game – TV Analysis & Ratings
 Major League Baseball All-Star Games: Super70s Baseball
 MLB All-Star Game Numbers Game | Sports Media Watch
 Classic Radio Broadcast > Special Events – MLB.com Shop
Classic Baseball on the Radio
 Searchable Network TV Broadcasts

All-Star Game broadcasters
Broadcasters
+All-Star Game
ABC Sports
CBS Sports
All-Star Game broadcasters
All-Star Game broadcasters
ESPN Radio
CBS Radio Sports
Mutual Broadcasting System